Springtime is a mid-19th century painting by French artist Pierre Auguste Cot. Done in oil on canvas, the painting is currently in the collection of the Metropolitan Museum of Art.

Description 
Springtime was painted by Cot in 1873. The painting was first exhibited at the 1873 Paris salon, where it was well received; the work would go on to become Cot's most successful work of art, and was often copied in other mediums. In terms of the painting itself, Cot's work depicts a young couple locked in an embrace on a swing amid a forest or garden. The two are wearing classical garb, and are seemingly enthralled by each other, described by one source as "drunken with first love".

References 

1873 paintings
Paintings by Pierre Auguste Cot
Paintings in the collection of the Metropolitan Museum of Art